is a Japanese composer. He has composed and synthesized scores for several Japanese television shows and animated series. Masuda is perhaps best known as the composer of the 2002 hit anime series Naruto where he combined traditional instruments like the shamisen and shakuhachi together with guitar, drums, bass, piano and other keyboard instruments along with chanting.

Works

Animation 
 Fatal Fury: Legend of the Hungry Wolf (1992)
 Flint the Time Detective (1998)
 Excel Saga (1999)
 Jubei-chan (1999)
 Di Gi Charat specials (2000)
 Hand Maid May (2000)
 Daa! Daa! Daa! (2000)
 Mahoromatic (2001)
 Puni Puni Poemy (2001)
 Naruto (2002)
 Ai Yori Aoshi (2002)
 Nanaka 6/17 (2003)
 Di Gi Charat: Leave it to Piyoko! (2004)
 Jubei-chan 2 (2004)
 Di Gi Charat Nyo! (2004)
 Mushishi (2005)
 Ghost Hunt (2006)
 Otogi-Jūshi Akazukin (2006)
 Higepiyo (2009)
 Kamisama Kiss (2013)
 Mushishi -Next Passage- (2014)
 Kamisama Kiss◎ (2015)
 Nobunaga no Shinobi (2016)
 Nobunaga no Shinobi: Anegawa Ishiyama-hen (2018)
 My Clueless First Friend (2023)

OVA 
 Animation Runner Kuromi (2001)
 Puni Puni Poemy (2001)
 Animation Runner Kuromi2 (2003)

Specials 
Mushi-Shi Special: The Shadow That Devours the Sun (2014)
Mushi-Shi -Next Passage- Special: Path of Thorns (2014)

Film 
Mushi-Shi -Next Passage- Special: Bell Droplets (2015)

References

External links
 
 last.fm page
 Toshio Masuda anime at Media Arts Database 

1959 births
Anime composers
Japanese composers
Japanese film score composers
Japanese male composers
Japanese male film score composers
Japanese rock guitarists
Living people
Musicians from Tokyo